Erwin Kehlhoffner (born 6 December 1983 in Strasbourg) is a badminton player from France and affiliations with ASL Robertsau club. In the junior event, he won the national singles title in 2002, and also the doubles titles in 2001 and 2002. Kehlhoffner competed at the 2005 World Championships in the men's singles and doubles event, but was defeated in the first round both in singles and doubles event. He also qualified to play at the 2006 World Championships in the men's doubles event with his partner Thomas Quéré, but the duo defeated by the German players in the first round. In 2007 he competed in the men's singles event, and was defeated in the first round by Richard Vaughan of Wales, 21–9, 22–20. He won the bronze medal at the 2008 European Championships in the men's doubles with Svetoslav Stoyanov. At the same year, he was qualified to participate in the men's singles event at the Olympic Games in Beijing, China. He reach in to the third round after beat Stuart Gomez of Australia and Eli Mambwe of Zambia in the first and two rounds, but was defeated by Chen Jin of China in the third round.

Achievements

European Championships
Men's doubles

BWF International Challenge/Series
Men's singles

Men's doubles

 BWF International Challenge tournament
 BWF International Series tournament

References

External links

1983 births
Living people
Sportspeople from Strasbourg
French male badminton players
Badminton players at the 2008 Summer Olympics
Olympic badminton players of France
21st-century French people